Hedensted Kommune is a municipality (Danish, kommune) in Region Midtjylland formed out of three former municipalities, one of which with the same name, 1 January 2007 on the Jutland peninsula in central Denmark. Its seat and main town is Hedensted.

Overview
The coastal town municipality south of Aarhus, and sandwiched in between Horsens and Vejle, and bordering Ikast-Brande Municipality to the northwest, covers an area of 551.36 km² and has a total population of 47,099 (1. January 2022). The main town and the site of its municipal council is the inland town of Hedensted. Its mayor from 1 January 2018 is Kasper Glyngø, a member of the Social Democratic Party. The first deputy mayor is Hans Kristian Skibby from the Danish People's Party.

On 1 January 2007, as a result of Kommunalreformen ("The Municipal Reform" of 2007), the former Juelsminde municipality and most of Tørring-Uldum municipality, where one parish, Grejs, in a local referendum 19 April 2005 chose to become a part of Vejle Municipality, was merged with the former Hedensted municipality that existed from 1970 until 2006.

The municipality is part of Business Region Aarhus and of the East Jutland metropolitan area, which had a total population of 1.378 million in 2016.

Locations

Politics

Municipal council
Hedensted's municipal council consists of 27 members, elected every four years.

Below are the municipal councils elected since the Municipal Reform of 2007.

References

Sources
 Municipal statistics: NetBorger Kommunefakta, delivered from KMD aka Kommunedata (Municipal Data)
 Municipal mergers and neighbors: Eniro  new municipalities map

External links 

 

 
Municipalities of the Central Denmark Region
Municipalities of Denmark
Populated places established in 2007